Rozemarijn Ammerlaan (born 4 January 2000) is a Dutch former racing cyclist, who last rode for UCI Women's Continental Team . She won the junior women's time trial event at the 2018 UCI Road World Championships. Ammerlaan retired from competition at the end of 2021.

Major results
2018
 1st  Time trial, UCI Junior Road World Championships
 1st  Time trial, National Junior Road Championships

References

External links

2000 births
Living people
Dutch female cyclists
Place of birth missing (living people)
Sportspeople from Delft
Cyclists from South Holland
21st-century Dutch women